Djibril Sidibé (born 23 March 1982) is a Malian former professional footballer who played as a defensive midfielder.

Career
On 8 July 2010, Sidibé signed a two-year contract with Maccabi Tel Aviv after completing a successful five-day trial with the team. On 27 June 2011, he was placed on the club's transfer list. On 31 August 2011, he was officially released from his contract.

Sidibé has represented Mali at international level earning 47 caps and scoring four goals.

Honours
Hapoel Ramat Gan
 Israel State Cup: 2012–13

Mali
Africa Cup of Nations fourth place: 2004

References

External links
 
 

1982 births
Living people
Malian footballers
Sportspeople from Bamako
JS Centre Salif Keita players
AS Monaco FC players
SC Bastia players
LB Châteauroux players
CS Sedan Ardennes players
Maccabi Tel Aviv F.C. players
Hapoel Ramat Gan F.C. players
Hapoel Ashkelon F.C. players
Red Star F.C. players
Ligue 1 players
Ligue 2 players
Israeli Premier League players
2002 African Cup of Nations players
2004 African Cup of Nations players
2008 Africa Cup of Nations players
Malian expatriate footballers
Mali international footballers
Expatriate footballers in France
Expatriate footballers in Monaco
Expatriate footballers in Israel
Malian expatriate sportspeople in France
Malian expatriate sportspeople in Monaco
Malian expatriate sportspeople in Israel
Association football midfielders
21st-century Malian people